Slovany is a village and municipality in Martin District in the Žilina Region of northern Slovakia.

History
In historical records the village was first mentioned in 1252.

Geography
The municipality lies at an altitude of 470 metres and covers an area of 14.303 km2. It has a population of about 410 people.

External links
http://www.slovany.eu

Villages and municipalities in Martin District